Tetraethylgermanium (common name tetraethyl germanium), abbreviated TEG, is an organogermanium compound with the formula (CH3CH2)4Ge. Tetraethylgermanium is an important chemical compound used in vapour deposition of germanium which is in a tetrahedral shape.

Synthesis
Clemens Winkler first reported the compound in 1887 from diethylzinc and germanium tetrachloride, shortly after germanium was discovered in 1887.

References

External links
 Tetraethylgermanium Datasheet commercial supplier

Organogermanium compounds
Germanium(IV) compounds